The 2021 Challenger de Santiago was a professional tennis tournament played on clay courts. It was the 13th edition of the tournament which was part of the 2021 ATP Challenger Tour. It took place in Santiago, Chile between 15 and 21 March 2021.

Singles main-draw entrants

Seeds

 1 Rankings are as of 8 March 2021.

Other entrants
The following players received wildcards into the singles main draw:
  Nicolás Jarry
  Gonzalo Lama
  Holger Rune

The following player received entry into the singles main draw as an alternate:
  Camilo Ugo Carabelli

The following players received entry from the qualifying draw:
  Martín Cuevas
  Nicolás Kicker
  João Menezes
  Gonzalo Villanueva

The following player received entry as a lucky loser:
  Rafael Matos

Champions

Singles

 Sebastián Báez def.  Marcelo Tomás Barrios Vera 6–3, 7–6(7–4).

Doubles

 Luis David Martínez /  Gonçalo Oliveira def.  Rafael Matos /  Felipe Meligeni Alves 7–5, 6–1.

References

2021 ATP Challenger Tour
2021
2021 in Chilean tennis
March 2021 sports events in Chile